The 2010 Florida Gators football team represented the University of Florida in the sport of American football during the 2010 college football season.  The Gators competed in the Football Bowl Subdivision (FBS) of the National Collegiate Athletic Association (NCAA) and the Eastern Division of the Southeastern Conference (SEC), and played their home games at Ben Hill Griffin Stadium on the university's Gainesville, Florida campus.  The season was the sixth and final campaign for coach Urban Meyer, who led the Gators to a 37–24 Outback Bowl victory over coach Joe Paterno's Penn State Nittany Lions, and an overall win–loss record of 8–5 (.615).

Previous season
In the 2009 season, the Gators went 12–0 in the regular season, but lost to Alabama in the SEC Championship game. The Gators concluded their season with a win over the Cincinnati Bearcats in the 2010 Sugar Bowl.

Pre-season
In the annual Orange and Blue Spring Game, the blue team won 27–24. Quarterback John Brantley was 15/19 and threw for 201 yards and 2 touchdowns. Trey Burton was 12/18 for 120 yards, 1 INT, 1 TD, 123 yards on 10 carries with 2 TDs.

Schedule

Sources: 2012 Florida Football Media Guide, and GatorZone.com.

Rankings

Game summaries

Miami (OH)

South Florida

Tennessee

Kentucky

Alabama

LSU

Mississippi State

Georgia
First College Football overtime game in Jacksonville, Florida

Vanderbilt

South Carolina

Appalachian State

Florida State

Personnel

Depth chart
(revised 10–30–10)

Roster

Coaching staff

Players drafted into the NFL

References 

Florida
Florida Gators football seasons
ReliaQuest Bowl champion seasons
Florida Gators football